Caroline Rosanna Pei Jia Chew (born 18 April 1992) is a Singaporean equestrian athlete and solicitor. She competed at the 2018 World Equestrian Games and the 2014 Asian Games in dressage, and at the 2010 Youth Olympic Games in show jumping. She won several medals during the Southeast Asian Games (from 2013 through 2017), and competed at the 2020 Summer Olympics.

Biography
Caroline Chew started riding at the age of six, following into footsteps of her family which is closely involved in equestrian. At the Singapore 2010 Youth Olympic Games, she competed in show jumping and placed 17th. Chew was selected to be the first athlete to present the Olympic oath at the Youth Olympic Games.

Chew later switched from show jumping to dressage, and became the most successful dressage rider for Singapore and the first Singaporean to compete at Grand Prix level, which is the highest in dressage. She competed as the first Singaporean dressage rider at the 2018 World Equestrian Games in Tryon, where she ranked 56th.

Following the withdrawal of New Zealand's rider from the 2020 Tokyo Olympic Games, a replacement rider was to be chosen from the Dressage Grand Prix held in Le Mans, France. Chew went to the Grand Prix and posted a personal best score of 69.674 and qualified for the Olympics. She is the first Singaporean equestrian athlete to participate at the Olympic Games. However, Chew was eliminated from the Games as her horse Tribiani was found to be bleeding from the mouth, caused by a stumble before the competition.

Personal life
Caroline Chew studied law at the Bristol University in England. Currently she lives in London and works full-time as a lawyer at Freshfields Bruckhaus Deringer, which she combines with horse riding. 

Her mother, Melanie, also served as the president of the Equestrian Federation of Singapore from 2007 to 2017. Her older sister Catherine is a successful show-jumper, who won individual silver and team gold during the 2015 Southeast Asian Games held in Singapore.

References

External links
 

1992 births
Living people
Singaporean dressage riders
Singaporean female equestrians
Singaporean women lawyers
Equestrians at the 2010 Summer Youth Olympics
Equestrians at the 2014 Asian Games
Competitors at the 2007 Southeast Asian Games
Competitors at the 2013 Southeast Asian Games
Competitors at the 2015 Southeast Asian Games
Competitors at the 2017 Southeast Asian Games
Southeast Asian Games medalists in equestrian
Southeast Asian Games silver medalists for Singapore
Southeast Asian Games bronze medalists for Singapore
Asian Games competitors for Singapore
Oath takers at the Olympic Games
Equestrians at the 2020 Summer Olympics
Olympic equestrians of Singapore